The 2013 Orange Open Guadeloupe was a professional tennis tournament played on hard courts. It was the third edition of the tournament which was part of the 2013 ATP Challenger Tour. It took place in Le Gosier, Guadeloupe between 25 and 31 March 2013.

Singles main-draw entrants

Seeds

 1 Rankings are as of March 18, 2013.

Other entrants
The following players received wildcards into the singles main draw:
  Kimmer Coppejans
  Calvin Hemery
  Julien Obry
  Benoît Paire

The following players received entry from the qualifying draw:
  Prakash Amritraj
  Roman Borvanov
  Gonzalo Lama
  John Peers

Doubles main-draw entrants

Seeds

1 Rankings as of March 18, 2013.

Champions

Singles

 Benoît Paire def.  Sergiy Stakhovsky, 6–4, 5–7, 6–4

Doubles

 Dudi Sela /  Jimmy Wang def.  Philipp Marx /  Florin Mergea, 6–1, 6–2

External links
Official Website

Orange Open Guadeloupe
Open de Guadeloupe
2013 in French tennis
2013 in Guadeloupean sport